NGC 7061 is an elliptical galaxy located about 400 million light-years away in the constellation of Indus. NGC 7061 was discovered by astronomer John Herschel on September 30, 1834.

See also 
 NGC 7012
 List of NGC objects (7001–7840)

References

External links 

Elliptical galaxies
Indus (constellation)
7061
66785
Astronomical objects discovered in 1834